William Hare (born February 7, 1944) is a philosopher whose writings deal primarily with problems in philosophy of education. He attended Wyggeston Grammar School for Boys, 1955–62. After receiving his B.A. from the University of London (1965), he gained an M.A. in philosophy from the University of Leicester (1968), and a Ph.D. in educational theory from the University of Toronto (1971). He was Professor of Education and Philosophy at Dalhousie University from 1970 to 1995, and subsequently Professor of Education at Mount Saint Vincent University until his retirement in June 2008. He is now Professor Emeritus. He is known mainly for his work on open-mindedness, and has published several papers dealing with philosophical ideas about education in the work of Bertrand Russell.

Selected books
 Open-mindedness and Education (1979)
 In Defence of Open-mindedness (1985)
 What Makes a Good Teacher (1993)

Edited works
(with John P. Portelli)
 Philosophy of Education: Introductory Readings (1988, 1996, 2001)
 Key Questions For Educators (2005)

Publications

References

Further reading 

 Hare, W. (2010) "Following the Argument: A Philosophical Memoir" Paideusis, Volume 19 (2010), No. 2., pp. 78–85 (Open Access)

1944 births
Alumni of the University of London
Alumni of the University of Leicester
University of Toronto alumni
Living people
People educated at Wyggeston Grammar School for Boys
Philosophers of education